Uzunlarovo (Oźondar) is a rural locality (a selo) and the administrative center of Uzunlarovsky Selsoviet, Arkhangelsky District, Bashkortostan, Russia. The population was 415 as of 2010. There are 9 streets.

Geography 
Uzunlarovo is located 20 km northeast of Arkhangelskoye (the district's administrative centre) by road. Valentinovka is the nearest rural locality.

References 

Rural localities in Arkhangelsky District